Stephen Senior (born 15 May 1963) is an English former professional footballer who played as a defender in the Football League for York City, Darlington, Northampton Town, Wigan Athletic and Preston North End.

Career
Born in Sheffield, West Riding of Yorkshire, Senior started his career at York City, where he was part of the team that were promoted from the Fourth Division in the 1983–84 season. In 1987, he moved to Northampton Town for a fee of £14,000. He went on to play for Wigan Athletic and Preston North End. Towards the end of his career, he also played for Bamber Bridge.

As of 2009, he owns a brick paving business in his hometown Sheffield.

References

External links

1963 births
Living people
Footballers from Sheffield
English footballers
Association football defenders
York City F.C. players
Darlington F.C. players
Northampton Town F.C. players
Wigan Athletic F.C. players
Preston North End F.C. players
Witton Albion F.C. players
English Football League players